Zaoying is a station on Line 14 of the Beijing Subway. It is located in Chaoyang District. The station opened on 28 December 2014.

Station layout 
The station has an underground island platform.

Exits 
There are 2 exits, lettered A and D. Exit D is accessible.

References

Railway stations in China opened in 2014
Beijing Subway stations in Chaoyang District